The 1982–83 British Home Championship was the penultimate in the series of football tournaments between the British Home Nations which stretched back 99 years to 1884. In 1983 England and then Scotland announced their withdrawal from future competition after the 1984 competition with the arrangement of the Rous Cup between the two nations to eliminate Wales and Northern Ireland, who were seen as weaker opposition. The 1983 tournament was a tight contest, which England won with a final victory at home over Scotland following an opening victory over Wales and a draw in Belfast. The game at Wembley was played in midweek in an attempt to curb the large number of travelling Scottish supporters. The Scots came second with a win over Wales and a draw with Northern Ireland off-setting their final day defeat. The Welsh succumbed to goal difference as the points system then in use meant that the Irish, who had drawn twice and lost once without scoring themselves gained the same number of points for a smaller goal difference despite Wales' victory over them in their final game.

Table

Results

References

External links
Full Results and Line-ups

1983
1983 in British sport
1982–83 in Northern Ireland association football
1982–83 in Welsh football
1982–83 in English football
1982–83 in Scottish football